The Embassy of Algeria in London is the diplomatic mission of Algeria in the United Kingdom. It was formerly located in Holland Park opposite the Embassy of Ukraine; however, it moved to 1 & 3 Riding House Street, Fitzrovia in 2012.

Algeria also maintains a Consulate at 5 Portal way North Acton, London W3 6RT

List of ambassadors 

 1963 to : Muhammad Kellou
 1964 to 1965: Laroussi Khalifa
 1965 to 1971: None (diplomatic relations broken)
 1971 to 1979: Lakhdar Brahimi
 1979 to 1982: Abdelkrim Benmahmoud
 1982 to 1984: Redha Malek
 1984 to 1988: Ahmed Laïdi
 1989 to ?: Abdelkrim Gheraieb
 1992 to 1994: Ali Lakhdari
 1994 to 1996: Amar Bendjama
 1996 to 2000: Ahmed Benyamina
 2001 to 2004: Ahmed Attaf
 2005 to 2010: Mohamed Salah Dembri
 2010 to 2019: Amar Abba
 2019 to now : Abderrahmane Benguerrah

Gallery

See also
List of diplomatic missions in London

References

External links
Official site

Diplomatic missions in London
Diplomatic missions of Algeria
Algeria–United Kingdom relations
Grade II listed buildings in the City of Westminster
Buildings and structures in the Royal Borough of Kensington and Chelsea
Fitzrovia